Many games have been independently developed for the Dreamcast by independent developers. Most of these games were commercially released long after the end of the console's official life span in North America where production was ceased by end of 2001, although Sega of America still offered support and had some games scheduled for release (but was the division at Sega who released the fewest titles after 2002, pretty much limited to NFL 2K2 and other games in the 2K genre) and so games kept being released for quite some time still after first announcing the move to 3rd party development, unlike 1st party titles of other regions like Puyo Puyo Fever being released in 2004 in Japan and a select few more in Europe, seeing as the Dreamcast was launched approximately 1.5 years later in Europe compared to Japan and 13 months later than North America, thus the last region the console was released on 20 October 2000. Meanwhile, in Japan, the console was released in November 1998, lasting with official support and console sales as well as hardware peripherals and games both developed and published by studios at Sega of Japan, from 1998 through 2007, almost giving the 6th generation console 10 years of official support in the region.

In comparison, the Xbox 360 had already been launched when Sega still was publishing games for the Dreamcast (and other platforms) in Japan.

However, most of the time, the online Sega Direct store was the only place to find new consoles which had been produced recently, often with special color variations such as Black and other limited edition collector items, and after the last official released title published by Sega of Japan, Karous (2007) hit store shelves, indie developers poured the console with commercially available games from all over the world, often with very tight time frames between each release generally, making the console in some ways, matter again well into the 7th generation of consoles.

Consequently, these games are unlicensed by Sega, although completely legal if created with a development environment which is not licensed by Sega as the games are not published by Sega, which always is mentioned during the license boot screen if they are, but which can be modified in the disc's IP. BIN to state that the software is not. All of these independent releases makes Dreamcast's titles that is still receiving 9 new game titles by 2020 already announced, thus making it more common than most release schedules since 2001 in at least North America.

IGN reopened their Dreamcast section in 2006 as Sega was publishing games like Under Defeat in 2005.

The Dreamcast's unlicensed games are produced and printed on regular compact discs (CD) using the Mil-CD format created in-house by Sega, which is just a normal CD unlike its native games format, the GD-ROM, aimed at karaoke and interactive content on regular CDs in general. Unlike the GD-ROMs though, which can hold up to 1.2GB of data, a CD-ROM can hold around 50% of that, and it would not be legal to develop games on a proprietary storage medium without permission or a license, and so to release independent titles for the Dreamcast legally, even selling them at retailers, which is what differs most Dreamcast releases of today with 'homebrew' by definition, as the Dreamcast does not require modifications of any sort as opposed to consoles requiring mod chips or other user-made modifications using a proprietary piece of software and or hardware like the original Xbox and its sequel, the Xbox 360, and that the Dreamcast titles state during the boot-up of the game that it is not published nor licensed by Sega, which all modern releases for the Dreamcast as of 2020 since 2004 has been doing to be able to sell them at retailers. Josh Prod among a few of the most serious and active studios, publishing exceptionally many high-quality titles after buying the right to have them ported, often by the studio owning those right also developing or porting them, which will boot on any Dreamcast, only some consoles manufactured between up until 2007 where Sega removed the MIL-CD support from the BIOS; console manufacturing in Japan was restarted to meet demand although no official numbers exist, probably in limited or few print runs but either way was selling new consoles and hardware through all of 2007. However, removing the MIL-CD compatible code in the BIOS, which since has been dumped and is of version 1.022; the last one to have been found so far, prevents owners of these consoles from playing games released on CD-Roms. While the last officially Sega published game, titled Karous, was released on the 3rd of March in 2007, which also has seen an unofficially translated version (ie actual 'homebrew') was made and released online in 2019, while a lot more titles were consistently released in Japan up until that point. Trigger Heart Exelica was one of them, along with Under Defeat (2005), Puyo Puyo Fever (2004) to name a few. However, those owning a console with the latest BIOS version, does not have the ability to out of the box, but have to replace their GD-ROM drive with an optical drive emulator, solder in a new or additional BIOS ROM chip to have the ability to boot up a game released on CD-ROM, like the Arcade Racing Legend by Josh Prod which was released in 2020 after a Kickstarter campaign.

Releasing games on half the size of the native format, however, can be a problem, depending on the game. Copies of games from GDs through Dreamshell to an SD-card or through the official broadband adapter, subsequently burnt to a blank CD, will results, or rather, can result in having to remove content which is often the case to make them fit on standard CDs, which depending on region can even be a felony. Thus making the independently released titles for Dreamcast which can be bought at most retailers, different from homebrew in that a completely stock console, will most likely boot the game, as with Gameshark, Action Replay, CodeBreaker and Bleemcast to name a few. The Japanese consoles not supporting MIL-CD will often tell you (in Japanese) on one side of the outer box.

The reason for releasing games on CDs instead of the native format is mostly because the GD-ROM format is no longer marketed by Sega, thus difficult to get a hold of, nor did it ever have a commercially available blank counterpart and would have made independent titles such those published by IP owner and publishing studio known as JoshProd which is by far the company with most independent titles released so far .

Another reason is that there is actual copy protection in place which has yet to be defeated without using the rare 'System Disc 2' – a disc by Sega for developers that unlocks the protection, making it possible to boot games burnt on GD-R discs, the blank GD-ROM equivalent to blank CD-R discs.

Games are mostly released in standard CD or DVD jewel cases, or more recently, styled as a retail Dreamcast case depending on region (where Japan had what may look like a DVD case). The regional style of the cases is a purely cosmetic option, because all independent titles released on CD-ROM are region-free as Mil-CDs in general cannot be region locked, while GD-Rom-based games indeed are, requiring one of many commercially released boot discs like the GameShark, CodeBreaker and others, which enable all regions to boot. Problems may arise when using this method because of PAL games on games where no option of 60 Hz is available in most of all PAL games released, being the first console to support PAL60 video output but which is implemented on a per-game basis as the Dreamcast itself does not contain an operating system, thus making games from regions other than PAL, which always run at 60 Hz, making the game not run at its intended full speed and may feature horizontal borders around the screen. The PS2 is notorious for not having many 60 Hz games in PAL regions.

Most of the games currently in development and most of the many recently released, have all been developed using the open source and free SDK known as KallistiOS, or an equally legal alternative, providing about the same functionality as Sega's own SDK developers have claimed, stating the Dreamcast is very developer friendly, however, some claim good performance is easier to achieve in 3D with the officially SEGA SDK, although illegal without a license to even use, let alone sell the games at retailers later, which makes it something directly illegal and may end in serious consequences, while also hindering a person If they should need support, as it is forbidden by law naturally few people use it when legal, free alternatives are available.

SEGA of Japan, regarding its much longer lasting audience and fanbase with a majorly prolonged time frame of enjoyment from their console as it lasted 6–9 years longer with new titles very regularly, while seeing a surge in popularity compared to earlier, saw the biggest majority of game releases as of after 2017 – the same year most of the online functions of the console was bought back Thanks to projects like the now finished project known as DCSERV but also the rather large community as a whole, inventing new methods of utilizing the modem to connect to the newly reverse engineered SegaNet replacement. way back to almost the beginning of the releases started coming, are almost exclusively of the English-only spoken type, making it hard for the Eastern audience. This also goes the other way, the difference being Japan saw far more officially Licensed releases.

However, Sega has recently teamed up with Retro-bit, to create Wireless controllers and more importantly, new controllers, for the Sega Dreamcast, the Sega Saturn and the Genesis kr Mega Drive, showcased at CES 2018.

All regions also prolonged the availability of the massively popular online pioneering game on a console, Sonic Team's Phantasy Star Online, free of charge up until 2008, simply because fans demanded it, originally being closed in 2004.

The indie games are various – some have Genesis-style 16-bit graphics, whereas others look more like Dreamcast-era games. However, the SDKs allowed to use are not as optimized for the hardware as their Sega licensed counterparts. The 16-bit games usually have also been released as homebrew for the Neo Geo AES console, and others may also have had releases for PC, mobile, or as downloadable indie titles for newer consoles, like Flashback for both Nintendo Switch and Sega Dreamcast. The first commercial unlicensed games in 2001 were three emulated and enhanced PlayStation games developed by Bleemcast!.

But even before then, there were non-GD-ROM-based discs around in the form of CodeBreaker, GameShark, Action Replay CDX and the VCD player, which never was licensed either.

Unlike homebrew communities for other consoles, the Dreamcast development scene is organized in development teams, such as the now-defunct RedSpotGames. or HUCAST Games, most notably is perhaps Josh Prod but recently there became yet another one, RetroSurgeGames.

There has recently been an increasing number of games being developed, since Sega of Japan officially ended production of Dreamcast consoles, albeit limited to Japan, by the end of year 2007, posting a fiscal profit of 1748 million ¥, and that was mostly because of "Consumer business".

And as of 2007, Dreamcast is still a popular and highly regarded console among many fans due to its impressive library of both mainstream and more offbeat titles, some claiming Sega was at its peak during the era, others claiming Sega did everything right but did not want to be in the hardware business, or at least not having the funds required to keep fighting the competition for much longer. It is, however, starting to gain a cult following, as the system is becoming harder to find. In fact, although Dreamcast was officially discontinued in January 2001, Sega continued to produce the console for a short time afterward due to rising demand in Japan, especially among collectors and hardcore fans.

In 2007, the same year Sega officially published the last official game for the Dreamcast, titled Karous; released in the spring, made a profit from Consumer hardware products, with a profit margin of over 1000 million Japanese Yen¥ the PS2 – which on the contrary, needs modifications to run indie games or unlicensed code, which means making software for the PS2 actual homebrew, correct, while with the Dreamcast – does not require anything to be done to boot released games, thus making the phrase homebrew, incorrect according to dictionaries as well as the underlying meaning of the word, implying at least somewhat the implication of illegal activities.

So the restart of console and hardware production although at very limited runs at least made profit at one point, that is, in the year of 2007, when Sega made over 1000 million ¥ in profit and has now partnered with Retro-bit to create new wireless controllers as well as new, cabled ones, already in store shelves as of March 2020, while its whole library of online games brought back thanks to the Dcserv-project probably also had an impact, as few other consoles have had the same happen.

Nevertheless, the games for Dreamcast in store shelves as of today and the years after 2007–2008 – 2020 are far from 'homebrew' and what has been released since 2007 are nothing more or less than indie productions from smaller sized studios for other platforms and are often multi-platform releases by serious companies.

While in North America, production ended already by the year 2001, shipments of consoles to Europe however, continued well into 2003 and even 2004. Nearly half of the list of more than 60 titles are games released since 2015. 2017 had the highest number of new Dreamcast releases since 2004 in Japan.

List

Released titles

Announced titles

Abandoned projects

References

External links

Dreamcast independently developed games
Dreamcast
Homebrew software
Video game development